Flávio Alex Valêncio (better known just as Flavinho; born 27 July 1983) is a Brazilian professional footballer who plays for CRB in the Série B. He formerly played for the Brazilian club Grêmio Barueri in the Campeonato Paulista and the Campeonato Brasileiro Série A and Neftchi Baku in the Azerbaijan Premier League

Career
Flavinho left Neftchi Baku by mutual consent on 14 July 2015 after five seasons with the club. 10 days later, Flavinho returned to Brazil, signing for Chapecoense in the Série A.

Career statistics

Club

Achievements
 Seongnam Ilhwa Chunma
K League (1): 2003
Neftchi Baku
Azerbaijan Premier League (3): 2010–11, 2011–12, 2012–13
Azerbaijan Cup (2): 2012–13, 2013–14

References

External links

1983 births
Living people
Brazilian footballers
Associação Chapecoense de Futebol players
Association football midfielders
Neftçi PFK players
Expatriate footballers in Azerbaijan
Brazilian expatriate sportspeople in Azerbaijan
Azerbaijan Premier League players
Brazilian expatriate footballers
Campeonato Brasileiro Série A players